Darren Bennett may refer to:
Darren Bennett (football player) (born 1965), former Australian rules football player and American football punter in the NFL
Darren Bennett (dancer) (born 1977), professional Latin ballroom dancer